Deadly Weapon is a 1989 American science fiction film directed by Michael Miner and starring Rodney Eastman.

Plot
A teenager named Zeke, who fantasizes that he is from outer space, is bullied by some other teens at school and deals with a drunken father, runaway mother and a sister who delights in being nasty to him. He finds a lost experimental military weapon in a river near his home. The weapon fires anti-gravity X-rays. Zeke uses it for self-defense as a means to deal with his persecutors, both at school and at home.

An army team led by the overzealous Lt. Dalton, responsible for originally losing the weapon, is sent to recover the weapon before its unstable reactor overloads and causes a meltdown. The situation degenerates into a siege.

Cast

 Rodney Eastman as Zeke "King Bee"
 Robert Benedetti as Bernard Bauhaus
 Arell Blanton as Edwin
 Susan Blu as Shirley
 Tom Cesano as Joey
 Ed Corbett as Engineer
 Gary Frank as Lieutenant Dalton
 Adam Gifford (as G. Adam Gifford)
 Michael Hennessey as Frampton
 Michael Horse as Indian Joe
 Richard Steven Horvitz as Lester (as Richard S. Horvitz)
 Sasha Jenson as Martin 
 William Sanderson as Reverend Smith 
 Kim Walker as Traci
 Gary Kroeger as Glover
 John Lafayette as Sgt. Conroy
 Barney Martin as Mayor Bigelow
 Sam Melville as Sheriff Bartlett

Production
RoboCop creator Michael Miner was invited by Charles Band to create a sequel to the 1978 film Laserblast, which was also produced by Band, in August 1986. Miner at this time worked as second unit director on RoboCop set. Although planned as a sequel to Laserblast, while writing the script - and partially due to financial constraints-, Band and Miner decided to make an original film, based on the central idea. Adapted from a story by George Lafia.

Deadly Weapon was filmed during May and June 1987.

Reception
Creature Feature found the movie to be unusually sensitive for a Charles Band production, giving the movie 3.5 out of 5 stars. The review praised the subtle handling of the theme of teen suicide as well its addressing the problems of growing up in a dysfunctional family.

Awards
Rodney Eastman was nominated for a Saturn Award best performance by a young actor.

Home Release
The movie was released on video by Trans World Entertainment on August 15, 1989. While a DVD release occurred in the Netherlands, no plans have been made to release the film onto DVD in the United States.

References

External links
 
 

1989 films
1989 science fiction films
American science fiction films
1980s English-language films
1980s American films
Films scored by Guy Moon